Narendran may refer to
T. V. Narendran, Tata Steel Manager.
Trichur C. Narendran, Mridangam artist.
T C Narendran,  Indian entomologist
Narendran Commission, Indian Commission.
Narendran Makan Jayakanthan Vaka, Malayalam  film.

Indian given names
Tamil masculine given names